Miguel Navarro, known in Latin as Michael Navarrus (Pamplona, 1563 – Pamplona, 2 January 1627) was a Spanish composer.

References

1563 births
1627 deaths